Marquess of Reading is a title in the Peerage of the United Kingdom. It was created in 1926 for Rufus Isaacs, who had been Member of Parliament for Reading between 1904 and 1913, before serving as Viceroy of India and Lord Chief Justice of England and Wales. He had already been created Baron Reading, of Erleigh in the County of Berkshire, in 1914, Viscount Reading, of Erleigh in the County of Berkshire, in 1916, and Viscount Erleigh, of Erleigh in the County of Berkshire, and Earl of Reading, in 1917.

The marquessate of Reading is the highest title in the British peerage ever attained by a Jew, and is the most recently created extant marquessate in the Peerage of the United Kingdom (that of Willingdon was created in 1936 but became extinct in 1979). In this role, the marquessate of Reading is currently the junior-most marquessate in the Order of precedence in England and Wales.

Upon the death of the 1st Marquess of Reading, he was succeeded by his son, the second marquess. He notably held ministerial office from 1951 to 1957 in the Conservative administrations of Winston Churchill and Anthony Eden.  the titles are held by his grandson, the fourth marquess, who succeeded his father in 1980. The family seat was Jaynes Court, near Bisley, Gloucestershire.

In May 1804, the title of Baron Reading was offered to the outgoing prime minister, Henry Addington, who had many links with the largely pre-industrialised town, as a subsidiary title of the customary retirement earldom for prime ministers. However, Addington refused the honour, though later accepting a peerage as Viscount Sidmouth.

Marquesses of Reading (1926)
Other titles (1st Marquess onwards): Baron Reading (UK, 1914), Viscount Reading (UK, 1916), Viscount Erleigh (UK, 1917), Earl of Reading (UK, 1917) 
Rufus Daniel Isaacs, 1st Marquess of Reading (1860–1935)
Gerald Rufus Isaacs, 2nd Marquess of Reading (1889–1960)
Michael Alfred Rufus Isaacs, 3rd Marquess of Reading (1916–1980)
Simon Charles Henry Rufus Isaacs, 4th Marquess of Reading (born 1942)

The heir apparent is the present holder's son, Julian Michael Rufus Isaacs, Viscount Erleigh (born 1986).

 Michael Isaacs, 3rd Marquess of Reading (1916–1980)
  Simon Isaacs, 4th Marquess of Reading (born 1942)
 (1) Julian Rufus Isaacs, Viscount Erleigh (born 1986)
 (2) Lord Antony Rufus Isaacs (born 1943)
 (3) Lord Alexander Rufus Isaacs (born 1957)

Notes

References
Kidd, Charles, Williamson, David (editors). Debrett's Peerage and Baronetage (1990 edition). New York: St Martin's Press, 1990, 

Lord Reading Yacht Club
Lord Reading Law Society

External links

See also
Earl of Banbury

Marquessates in the Peerage of the United Kingdom
Noble titles created in 1926
Noble titles created for UK MPs